The NTW-20 is a South African anti-materiel rifle, developed by Denel Mechem in the 1990s. It is intended for deployment against targets including parked aircraft, telecommunication masts, power lines, missile sites, radar installations, refineries, satellite dishes, gun emplacements, bunkers, and personnel, using a range of specialised projectiles. As with other weapons of this type, it can also be used for counter sniping and ordnance disposal (shooting explosive ordnance from a safe distance).

Development
The weapon was designed by Tony Neophytou (co-designer of the Neostead combat shotgun). Development of the system began in August 1995 under the "Aerotek" name and a working prototype was ready for testing four and a half months later. This rapid progress was made possible by Neophytou's expertise in the field of recoil reduction systems, having worked on helicopter turrets in the past. To further reduce the amount of research and development, the project recycled the barrel, bolt and barrel extension of the existing Vektor GA1 automatic cannon. It was put into production by Denel Land Systems in two versions; 20 x 110 and 20 x 82. The latter model is also available in 14.5 x 114 and conversion between the calibres can be done in the field by swapping the barrel and bolt assembly. The significantly larger 20 x 110 model cannot be converted to another calibre. The rifle was accepted into service with the South African National Defence Force in 1998..

Features
Switching between the two calibres of the NTW (20×82mm and 14.5×114mm) requires changing the bolt, barrel, sighting gear and magazine.  (A third variant, the NTW 20×110mm has been developed, but is not designed for barrel calibre switching.) Caliber switching the NTW 20/14.5 can be accomplished in the field without specialised tools. The magazine protrudes from the left side of the receiver. The NTW can be disassembled and packed into two backpacks for carriage. A muzzle brake is fitted on the end of the barrel which absorbs an estimated 50%–60% of recoil. This is further supplemented by a buffered slide in the receiver.

Variants

Influence
Denel Land Systems was contracted to supply weapon systems for the Indian Armed Forces, including anti-materiel rifles and self-propelled howitzers. However, following allegations that it had paid kickbacks to secure a deal for anti-materiel rifles, Denel was blacklisted by the Indian government. Subsequently, the Ordnance Factory Tiruchirappalli (OFT), in association with the Defence Research and Development Organisation (DRDO), began developing an indigenous anti-material rifle called Vidhwansak, which borrowed heavily from the Denel NTW-20. The development of Vidhwansak was completed in November 2005. The embargo against Denel was lifted in 2018 after investigations found the allegations to have been false.

In popular culture 
In the 2009 film District 9, a Denel NTW-20 rifle is used to attack an alien mech suit.

See also 
 RT-20 (rifle)
 Truvelo Sniper Rifles
 Vidhwansak
 Longest recorded sniper kills

References

Bibliography

External links 
 NTW 20 anti-materiel rifle 20 x 82 mm
 NTW 20 anti-materiel rifle 20 x 110 mm HS
 Modern Firearms Page
 

14.5×114mm sniper rifles
20 mm artillery
Bolt-action rifles
20mm sniper rifles
Post–Cold War weapons of South Africa
Rifles of South Africa
Denel
Anti-materiel rifles
Single-shot rifles
Weapons and ammunition introduced in 1998